Annie Karni is an American journalist who is a White House correspondent for The New York Times. She is a contributor on MSNBC.

Education 
Karni was born in Baltimore, Maryland, to Barbara S. Karni and Edi Karni. She attended the Park School of Baltimore before receiving a B.A. in English from Haverford College in 2004.

Career 
Karni began her career as a reporter at The New York Sun in 2005 where she stayed until she moved to The New York Post in 2008. Karni spent a year writing for Crain's before she was appointed political reporter for the New York Daily News. In total, at the New York tabloids, she spent a decade covering the City Hall and local news.

She first entered the national sphere when she joined Politico as a politics reporter in 2015. Karni joined The New York Times as a White House correspondent in 2018 after the departure of Julie Hirschfeld Davis, who had changed beat to report on Congress. Karni often embeds a feminist perspective in her reporting. She has appeared on PBS' Washington Week as a political analyst.

Personal life
Karni married Ted Mann, a reporter for The Wall Street Journal, in 2015.

References

External links
 

Living people
Year of birth missing (living people)
People from Baltimore
Park School of Baltimore alumni
Haverford College alumni
The New York Times people
Politico people
American newspaper journalists
American political journalists